Rudolf von Jaksch (16 July 1855, Prag-Weinberge (the Vinohrady District of Prague) – 8 January 1947, Hracholusky (Czech Republic), also Rudolf Jaksch von Wartenhorst, was an Austrian and Czech internist. He was the son of physician Anton von Jaksch (1810-1887). In 1889 he described the disease anaemia leucaemica infantum, a chronic anemic disease that affects children under three years of age, which was named "Jaksch's anemia" for him.

Life
He studied medicine at the universities of Prague and Strassburg, earning his doctorate at Prague in 1878. Following graduation he remained in Prague as an assistant to pathologist Edwin Klebs. From 1879 to 1881 he worked with his father, and in 1881-82 was an assistant to Alfred Pribram. In 1882 he moved to Vienna, where he was assistant to Hermann Nothnagel. The following year he received his habilitation in internal medicine.

In 1887 he was appointed professor of pediatrics at the University of Graz, later becoming a professor of internal medicine and director of the second internal clinic at Karl-Ferdinands-Universität (German University) in Prague. Here, he was instrumental in the construction of a modern clinic that first opened in 1899. He worked in Prague until his retirement in 1925.

He was a prolific author, one of his better efforts being Klinische Diagnostik innerer Krankheiten (1882), a work that was published over several editions and later translated into English as Clinical diagnosis : the bacteriological, chemical, and microscopical evidence of disease.

On his initiative he started with the construction of a new, much more modern and hygienic designed clinic that was opened in 1899. Jaksch was awarded in 1899 for this construction of his permanent bathrooms at the nursing exhibition in Berlin.
He was widely honored and awarded, and was included as a member of the Leopoldin-Karolin, the German Academy of Natural Scientists in Halle and the medical surgical academy in Perugia.

In 1882 von Jaksch married Adele von Haerdtl (1867−1944) in Vienna. They had one son and three daughters.
He had one brother named August Jaksch von Wartenhorst (Prague 2 jan 1859 - Klagenfurt 3 jan 1939).

Discoveries

In urine Jaksch discovered acetoacetic acid, a melanin probe and manganese toxicosis.
He also discovered new diseases such as Von Jaksch's disease (he himself named it anemia pseudoleukaemica infantum). 
In 1923 he was the first one who discovered the autoimmune disease relapsing polychondritis, that he himself named polychondropathia.

Further reading

 Jaksch von Wartenhorst, Rudolf (1855-1947) in Österreichisches Biographisches Lexikon 1815-1950, Bd. 3 (Lfg. 11, 1961), S. 66 (also online here)(German)

References

External links

1855 births
1947 deaths
19th-century Czech physicians
Austrian pediatricians
Academic staff of Charles University
Academic staff of the University of Graz
Bohemian nobility
German Bohemian people
Physicians from Prague